Ronald Sherr (1952 – December 7, 2022) was an American portrait painter. He depicted many well-known politicians and businesspeople.

Biography
Sherr was born in 1952 in New Jersey.
He attended the DuCret School of Art and the National Academy of Design. He had studios in New York City and Hong Kong.

Sherr died on December 7, 2022, at the age of 70.

Notable subjects

References

1952 births
2022 deaths
American portrait painters
National Academy of Design alumni
Painters from New Jersey
20th-century American painters
20th-century American male artists
21st-century American painters
21st-century American male artists
American male painters